is an adventure game based on scuba diving. It is the first of the Everblue series and was followed by Everblue 2 in 2002. It was released in Japan in 2001 and in Europe in 2002. It was developed by Arika.

Plot
The player plays as Leo, a novice scuba diver, searching for treasure and learning about marine animal life.

Gameplay
It is a first person game set underwater. The player takes the role of a scuba diver salvaging items from sunken ships and photographing underwater wildlife while either avoiding or confronting predators like sharks. The game also features an inventory system for collected objects, healing items, weapons, and tools, as well as an above water town with shops and NPCs.

Reviews

Everblue received "unfavorable" reviews according to the review aggregation website GameRankings. In Japan, Famitsu gave it a score of 31 out of 40.

References

2001 video games
Arika games
Capcom franchises
PlayStation 2 games
PlayStation 2-only games
Scuba diving video games
Video games developed in Japan
Video games scored by Yousuke Yasui
Video games with underwater settings